Lalla Rookh Station, often referred to as Lalla Rookh, is a pastoral lease that once operated as a sheep station but now operates as a cattle station.

The station was founded some time before 1903, and was owned by F. Thelemann in that year. Gold mines were operating in the area in 1916.

The  station is currently one of the Strelley properties, five pastoral leases held by Indigenous Australian groups including the Strelley Pastoral Company. Other properties in the group are Carlindi, Strelley and Callawa Station.

See also
List of ranches and stations

References

Pastoral leases in Western Australia
Stations (Australian agriculture)
Pilbara